The 1300s was a decade of the Julian Calendar that began on 1 January 1300 and ended on 31 December 1309.

Significant people

References